Khaziravi is a surname. Notable people with the surname include:

Ahmad Khaziravi (born 1989), Iranian footballer
Hamzeh Khaziravi (born 1994), Iranian footballer
Mojahed Khaziravi (born 1980), Iranian footballer

Surnames of Iranian origin